Mehele     is a village development committee in the Himalayas of Taplejung District in the Mechi Zone of north-eastern Nepal. At the time of the 2011 Nepal census it had a population of 2,357 people living in 463 individual households. There were 1,148 males and 1,209 females at the time of census.

References

External links
UN map of the municipalities of Taplejung District

Populated places in Taplejung District